2015 Rugby Europe Women's Sevens – Division B. Denmark won the B Division Tournament and was promoted to Division A along with runner-up Israel for the 2016 Competition. They will replace Georgia and Lithuania who were both Relegated from Division A to Division B for the 2016 Competition.

Tournament

Pool stage

Pool A

Pool B

Pool C

Knockout stage

Bowl

Plate

Cup

Division B standings

References

B
Rugby
Women
Rugby Europe Women's Sevens Conference